Spice Girls: How Girl Power Changed Britain is a three-part British television documentary produced and directed by Vari Innes, Alice McMahon-Major, and Jessica Ranja. The documentary examines modern feminism in the United Kingdom, particularly "girl power", through the lives and legacy of British girl group the Spice Girls.

The production company 72 Films was commissioned to produce the series by Channel 4 in 2020, under the working title Girl Powered: The Spice Girls. Spice Girls: How Girl Power Changed Britain premiered on Channel 4 from 14 to 28 September 2021.

Episodes

Critical response
The premiere received generally positive reviews. The Guardians Rebecca Nicholson called it a "fabulous and intimate" documentary and gave it four out of five stars. Elizabeth Aubrey of The Independent similarly gave the premiere four out of five stars, finding it to be a "damning" critique of the music industry in the 1990s. James Jackson of The Times gave the episode three out of five stars and concluded that it was "an intelligent bit of back-to-the-1990s nostalgia layered with dismay at the era's laddism." The Daily Telegraphs Kat Brown also gave it three stars, finding the lack of input from the Spice Girls themselves to be a notable omission.

References

English-language television shows
2020s British documentary television series
Works about the Spice Girls
2021 British television series debuts
2021 British television series endings
Documentary television series about music